Chengalam East  is a village in Kottayam district in the state of Kerala, India.

Demographics
 India census, Chengalam East had a population of 11879 with 5865 males and 6014 females.

References

Villages in Kottayam district